Novolavela is a rural locality (a settlement) and the administrative center of Lavelskoye Rural Settlement of Pinezhsky District, Arkhangelsk Oblast, Russia. The population was 1,024 as of 2010. There are 19 streets.

Geography 
Novolavela is located 83 km southeast of Karpogory (the district's administrative centre) by road. Zayedovye is the nearest rural locality.

References 

Rural localities in Pinezhsky District